For the ecclesiastical title, see Propst (German) or Provost (English).

Probst is a surname. Notable people with the surname include: 

 Christoph Probst (1919–1943), German resistance fighter
 Eva Probst (1930–2018), German actress
 Jeff Probst (born 1962), American television personality
 Larry Probst, CEO of Electronic Arts
 Paul Probst (1869–1945), Swiss sports shooter
 Pierre Probst (1913–2007), French cartoonist